December 7 - Eastern Orthodox liturgical calendar - December 9

All fixed commemorations below celebrated on December 21 by Eastern Orthodox Churches on the Old Calendar.

For December 8th, Orthodox Churches on the Old Calendar commemorate the Saints listed on November 25.

Saints
 Holy Apostles of the Seventy (1st century):
 Sosthenes, Apollos, Cephas, Tychicus, Epaphroditus, Caesar, and Onesiphorus. 
 Saint Patapius of Thebes (4th century)
 Holy 362 Martyrs of Africa, martyred by the Arians (477): (see also December 7)Great Synaxaristes:  Οἱ Ἅγιοι 60 Μάρτυρες ἱερεῖς. 7 Δεκεμβρίου. ΜΕΓΑΣ ΣΥΝΑΞΑΡΙΣΤΗΣ.
 62 priests and 300 laymen martyred by the Arians.
 Venerable Sophronius, Bishop of Cyprus (8th century)
 Venerable Aeros, Archbishop of the Church of Jerusalem.

Pre-Schism Western saints
 Saint Eucharius (Valerius), first Bishop of Trier in Germany (c. 250)
 Saint Eutychian, Pope of Rome, venerated as a martyr (283)
 Martyr Anthusa (Anthysa) at Rome (5th century)
 Saint Budoc, Bishop of Plourin Ploudalmezeau in Finistère (6th century)
 Saint Romaricus, monk at Luxeuil Abbey, later founded the monastery of Habendum (Remiremont Abbey, Romarici Mons), and became the second abbot (653)
 Saint Gunthild, a nun from Wimborne in England, went to Germany and became Abbess of a convent in Thuringia (748)

Post-Schism Orthodox saints
 Saint Cyril, Abbot of Chelmogorsk, Enlightener of the Chudian People (1367)

New martyrs and confessors
 Hieromartyr Michael Kiselev, Protopresbyter, new martyr of Perm (1918)
 Hieromartyr Alexander Fedoseyev, Priest, new martyr of Perm (1918)
 Hieromartyr Sergius Orlov (1937)

Icon gallery

Notes

References

Sources 
 December 8/21. Orthodox Calendar (PRAVOSLAVIE.RU).
 December 21 / December 8. HOLY TRINITY RUSSIAN ORTHODOX CHURCH (A parish of the Patriarchate of Moscow).
 December 7. OCA - The Lives of the Saints.
 December 8. Latin Saints of the Orthodox Patriarchate of Rome.
 The Roman Martyrology. Transl. by the Archbishop of Baltimore. Last Edition, According to the Copy Printed at Rome in 1914. Revised Edition, with the Imprimatur of His Eminence Cardinal Gibbons. Baltimore: John Murphy Company, 1916. pp. 377–378.
Greek Sources
 Great Synaxaristes:  8 ΔΕΚΕΜΒΡΙΟΥ. ΜΕΓΑΣ ΣΥΝΑΞΑΡΙΣΤΗΣ.
  Συναξαριστής. 8 Δεκεμβρίου. ECCLESIA.GR. (H ΕΚΚΛΗΣΙΑ ΤΗΣ ΕΛΛΑΔΟΣ). 
Russian Sources
  21 декабря (8 декабря). Православная Энциклопедия под редакцией Патриарха Московского и всея Руси Кирилла (электронная версия). (Orthodox Encyclopedia - Pravenc.ru).
  8 декабря (ст.ст.) 21 декабря 2013 (нов. ст.). Русская Православная Церковь Отдел внешних церковных связей. (DECR).

December in the Eastern Orthodox calendar